Caesalpinia is a genus of flowering plants in the family Fabaceae. Historically, membership within the genus has been highly variable, with different publications including anywhere from 70 to 165 species, depending largely on the inclusion or exclusion of species alternately listed under genera such as Hoffmannseggia. It contains tropical or subtropical woody plants. The generic name honours the botanist, physician, and philosopher Andrea Cesalpino (1519–1603).

The name Caesalpinaceae at family level, or Caesalpinioideae at the level of subfamily, is based on this generic name.

Species

 Caesalpinia acapulcensis Standl.
 Caesalpinia anacantha Urb.
 Caesalpinia bahamensis Lam.
 Caesalpinia barahonensis Urb.

 Caesalpinia brasiliensis L.

 Caesalpinia cassioides Willd. 1809

Caesalpinia erianthera Chiov.

 Caesalpinia monensis Britton—black nicker

 Caesalpinia nipensis Urb.

 Caesalpinia pulcherrima (L. 1753) Sw. 1791—Pride of Barbados, yellow peacock

 Caesalpinia secundiflora Urb.

 Caesalpinia delphinensis Du Puy & Rabev.
 Caesalpinia homblei R. Wilczek
 Caesalpinia minax Hance
 Caesalpinia murifructa Gillis & Proctor
 Caesalpinia solomonensis Hattink
 Caesalpinia volkensii Harms
 Caesalpinia caesia Handel-Mazzetti
 Caesalpinia chinensis Roxb.
 Caesalpinia crista L. emend. Dandy & Exell—gray nicker
 Caesalpinia elliptifolia S. J. Li, Z. Y. Chen & D. X. Zhang
 Caesalpinia hypoglauca Chun & How
 Caesalpinia kwangtungensis Merr.
 Caesalpinia laevigata Perr.
 Caesalpinia magnifoliolata Metcalf
 Caesalpinia nuga (L.) Ait.
 Caesalpinia paniculata (Lam.) Roxb.
 Caesalpinia rhombifolia J. E. Vidal
 Caesalpinia scandens Heyne ex Roth
 Caesalpinia szechuanensis Craib
 Caesalpinia vernalis Champion
 Caesalpinia yunnanensis S. J. Li, D. X. Zhang & Z. Y. Chen

Uses
Some species are grown for their ornamental flowers.

References

External links
  

USDA PLANTS Profile

Caesalpinieae
Fabaceae genera
Taxa named by Carl Linnaeus